The emotional hedge is a type of sports bet in which a fan of a certain team bets against the team they are emotionally attached to, so if their team loses, they will win money and feel less bad about it. Some fans who do the bet see it as a win–win, because in each scenario, they either make money (minimalizing disappointment) or are pleased to see their team win.

Reluctance 
Despite the fact that the emotional hedge guarantees the bettor one positive outcome, it is rarely observed. Optimism bias, in which the probability of a positive outcome is overestimated by an emotionally-driven bettor, plays a part in many people's decision not to make the bet. Many are also reluctant to make the bet because they feel that it is disloyal, that they are essentially betraying their favorite sports team.

See also 
 Hedge (finance)
 Sports betting

References 

Sports betting